Werner Mattle (born 6 November 1949) is a Swiss former alpine skier and Olympic medalist. He received a bronze medal in the giant slalom at the 1972 Winter Olympics in Sapporo.

References

External links

1949 births
Living people
Olympic alpine skiers of Switzerland
Alpine skiers at the 1972 Winter Olympics
Olympic bronze medalists for Switzerland
Olympic medalists in alpine skiing

Swiss male alpine skiers
Medalists at the 1972 Winter Olympics
20th-century Swiss people